The Cloud of Unknowing is the fifth studio album from James Blackshaw and takes its title from a medieval book. It was released in the United States on June 5, 2007.

Track listing 
 "The Cloud of Unknowing" – 10:55
 "Running to the Ghost" – 6:16
 "Clouds Collapse" – 3:56
 "The Mirror Speaks" – 6:31
 "Stained Glass Windows" – 15:03

References 

2007 albums
James Blackshaw albums
Instrumental albums